Rokhlin is a Slavic language-influenced Jewish surname of matronymic derivation.  It literally means "Rokhl's", where "Rokhl" is a transcription of Rochl, a Yiddish form of the name Rachel. Variants include Rohlin, Rochlin and (via French) Rochline. The feminine form in Slavic cultures is Rokhlina / Rochlina.

Notable people with this surname include:

Rokhlin
 Lev Rokhlin, Russian Lieutenant-General
 Vladimir Abramovich Rokhlin, Soviet mathematician
 Vladimir Rokhlin Jr., American mathematician and professor at Yale University, son of the above

Rochlin
Davida Rochlin, American architect
Emma Rochlin, Scottish field hockey player
Irma S. Rochlin, American politician from Florida

Rohlin
Charlotte Rohlin
Kimmo Rohlin
Leif Rohlin

Other
 Vera Rockline (1896–1934), birth name Vera Nikolayevna Rokhlina, Russian post-impressionist painter

See also
Rashkin (surname)
Raskin

Jewish surnames
Russian-language surnames
Matronymic surnames